Phillip Oval, known for sponsorship reasons as EPC Solar Park, is a sporting venue in Canberra, Australia. It is located in Phillip, in the district of Woden Valley.

The ground is used for Australian rules football and cricket. The ground was upgraded in 2018, with a renovated pavilion, changing rooms, and the addition of floodlights and an electronic scoreboard.

Usage

Australian rules football
Phillip Oval is viewed as the second tier ground for AFL in Canberra, after Manuka Oval. Canberra Football Club train and play home matches at the ground, and have increasingly moved to playing at Phillip Oval since its redevelopment in 2018.

Cricket
The ground is the secondary ground of ACT Meteors, after Manuka Oval. They played their first match at the ground in January 2020, against England as a warm-up for the touring side's upcoming tri-series. Later that season, the side used it for its first Women's National Cricket League games, playing two matches in February 2020. The ground was the Meteors' sole home ground in the 2020–21 and 2021–22 seasons. The ground was also used for all six matches on England A's tour of Australia in 2021–22.

References

External links
Phillip Oval on Cricinfo
Phillip Oval, Canberra on CricketArchive

Australian Football League grounds
Sports venues in Canberra
Cricket grounds in Australia
ACT Meteors